Sójkówek  is a village in the administrative district of Gmina Sadowne, within Węgrów County, Masovian Voivodeship, in east-central Poland.

Sójkówek is a small village situated between Sadowne and Brok (road 50).
Located upon Kanał Kacapski (aka "Struga"), meliorative canal, build by Soviet soldiers captured during the 1920 Polish-Soviet war.
Also close to the Bug river - the second longest Polish river.

The nearest train station is Sadowne Węgrowskie - approximately 5 km from Sójkowek.

References

Villages in Węgrów County